The President of the Queensland Legislative Council, also known as the Presiding Officer of the Council, was the presiding officer of the Queensland Legislative Council, the upper house of the Parliament of Queensland from 1860 until 1922 and analogous to the President of the Australian Senate.

Role of the president
The President was a Member of the Queensland Legislative Council, and was the ceremonial head of that Council.  The President therefore performed ceremonial duties, and represented the Council to other organisations.  In conjunction with the Speaker of the Legislative Assembly of Queensland, the President was responsible for the administration of the Parliament of Queensland. When the Council was sitting, the President enforced procedures, maintained order and put questions after debate. The President also made decisions and formal rulings with regards to the chamber's standing orders.

The President was appointed by the Governor of Queensland on recommendation from the Government. It was not seen as a political role.

List of presidents of the Legislative Council
The presidents of the Queensland Legislative Council were:

References

Queensland